{{DISPLAYTITLE:C15H15N}}
The molecular formula C15H15N (molar mass: 209.28 g/mol, exact mass: 209.1204 u) may refer to:

 9-Aminomethyl-9,10-dihydroanthracene (AMDA)
 Centanafadine (EB-1020)

Molecular formulas